Svend Simon Schultz (December 30, 1913 – June 6, 1998) was a Danish composer and conductor. A pupil of Poul Schierbeck.

Notable works 
Bag kulisserne (1949)
Kaffehuset (1949)
Solbadet (1949)
Høst (1950)
Tordenvejret eller Da Søren blev Mand (1950)
Bryllupsrejse (1951)
Marionetterne (1957)
Hosekræmmeren (1975, opført 1990)

See also 
 List of Danish composers

References 
 This article was initially translated from the Danish Wikipedia.

External links
 List of works at Edition S (publisher)

Male composers
1913 births
1998 deaths
20th-century Danish composers
20th-century Danish male musicians